Duivenbode, also spelt Duyvenbode, Duijvenbode, or Duivenboden, is a Dutch family name which may refer to:

 Dirk van Duijvenbode (born 1992), Dutch darts player
 Maarten Dirk van Renesse van Duivenbode (1804–1878) Dutch merchant, trader in bird skins on Ternate (Dutch East Indies)
 Mike van Duivenbode (born 1999), Dutch darts player
 Theo van Duivenbode (born 1943), Dutch soccer player

Dutch-language surnames